Severina is a novella by Guatemalan writer Rodrigo Rey Rosa, originally published in 2011. The work is written using the first person narrative mode and is dedicated to Beatriz Zamora.

Plot summary
The story is told from the point of view of a bookseller who finds himself romantically drawn to a young woman he catches stealing books from La Entretenida, the bookstore where he works.

English translations
Severina has been translated, with an introduction, into English once by Chris Andrews for Yale University Press's Margellos World Republic of Letters series.

References
Rey Rosa, Rodrigo: Severina. New Haven and London: Yale University Press, 2014.

2011 novels
Guatemalan fiction
Alfaguara books